is an interchange passenger railway station and monorail station on located in the city of  Hino, Tokyo, Japan. Most of the passengers boarding at Takahatafudō are commuters and students bound for central Tokyo, while those disembarking are visiting the Kongō-ji Temple or are students transferring to the monorail or buses.

Lines 
Takahatafudō Station is served by the Keio Line, and is located 29.7 kilometers from the starting point of the line at Shinjuku Station. It is also the terminus of the Keiō Dōbutsuen Line. The Tama Toshi Monorail Line also serves Takahatafudō Station.

Station layout

Keio platforms
The Keio station has two island platforms with four tracks for the Keio Line, and one side platform for the Keio Dōbutsuen Line. All trains stop at this station.

Tama Toshi Monorail platforms
Takahatafudō Station is a raised station with two tracks and two opposed side platforms, with the station building located underneath. It is a standardized station building for this monorail line. Due to the concentration of university campuses towards , many students change trains at this station.

History

 24 March 1925: Takahata Station opens along with the opening of the Gyokunan Electric Railway (now Keio Line), in a different location than the current station building.
 1 May 1937: Station renamed from Takahata Station to Takahatafudō Station.
 1957: Four-car rapid and semi-rapid trains to Shinjuku begin operating during peak periods.
 29 April 1964: The Tama Dōbutsuen Line (now Dōbutsuen Line) opens. Station building moved to current location.
 10 January 2000: The Tama Toshi Monorail Line station opens.
 March 2004: Station building shopping area construction begins.
 August 2004: Station building elevation construction begins.
 December 2004: Shopping area construction completed.
 25 March 2007: Station building elevation complete, linking the Keio and monorail station areas and shopping areas.
 February 2018: Station numbering was introduced on the Tama Toshi Monorail Line with the station being assigned TT07.

Passenger statistics
In fiscal 2019, the Keio station was used by an average of 58,426 passengers daily. During the same period, the Tama Monorail portion of the station was used by 26,148 passengers daily.

Surrounding area
The namesake of the station is Kongōji Temple, also known as Takahatafudō, one of the great temples of the Kantō region. The area's development was guided first by worshippers visiting the temple, then by suburbanization during the 1960s and 1970s. The station is a major transportation hub for Hino, with many municipal facilities and shopping centers in the vicinity.

References

External links

 Keio Corporation - Takahatafudō Station 
 Tama Monorail Takahatafudō Station 
 Keio Takahata Shopping Center 

Railway stations in Japan opened in 1925
Railway stations in Tokyo
Tama Toshi Monorail
Keio Line
Stations of Keio Corporation
Hino, Tokyo